Hot Water is a 1937 American comedy film directed by Frank R. Strayer and starring Jed Prouty, Shirley Deane and Spring Byington. It is part of the Jones Family series of films. The Jones father decides to run for mayor, leading the current incumbent to try to disgrace his son.

The film's sets were designed by the art director Chester Gore.

Plot summary

Partial cast

References

Bibliography
 Bernard A. Drew. Motion Picture Series and Sequels: A Reference Guide. Routledge, 2013.

External links
 
 
 
 

1937 films
1937 comedy films
American comedy films
Films directed by Frank R. Strayer
20th Century Fox films
American black-and-white films
Films scored by Samuel Kaylin
1930s English-language films
1930s American films